Monobryozoon is a genus of bryozoans belonging to the family Monobryozoidae.

The species of this genus are found in Northern Europe.

Species:

Monobryozoon ambulans 
Monobryozoon bulbosum 
Monobryozoon sandersi

References

Bryozoan genera